Satit Ubolkhoa  is a Thai retired football midfielder who was an unused substitute for Thailand in the 1996 Asian Cup. He also played for F.C. Pampilhosa.

References

1976 births
Living people
Satit Ubolkhoa
Place of birth missing (living people)
Association football midfielders
Satit Ubolkhoa